Alf Shea (November 7, 1898 – May 21, 1969) was a Welsh cricketer. He was a right-handed batsman and a right-arm medium-pace bowler who played for Glamorgan. He was born in Briton Ferry and died in Neath.

Shea played his club cricket with Briton Ferry and secured his chance to play two games for Glamorgan in 1928. He scored 22 runs in three innings and took just one wicket from 41 overs of bowling.

Shea's nephew, Dennis, made three first-class appearances for Glamorgan soon after the end of the Second World War.

External links
Alf Shea  at Cricket Archive 

1898 births
1969 deaths
Cricketers from Briton Ferry
Welsh cricketers
Glamorgan cricketers